Hot Tamales is a cinnamon-flavored candy introduced in 1950 manufactured and marketed in the United States by Just Born. They were invented by Bob Born after reworking Mike & Ike Candy. The name derives from the sometimes spicy flavor of tamales. It was the top-selling cinnamon candy in 1999.

Variations
In 2011, Just Born released Hot Tamales 3 ALARM containing a mix of three candies: orange (hot), pinkish (hotter) and dark red (hottest). Around this time, Just Born also marketed Hot Tamales Fire (originally Super Hot Hot Tamales) with a hotter flavor and darker color. In 2014, Just Born released Hot Tamales Tropical Heat that contains three candies, combining the original pungent, spicy flavor with lemon, mango and pineapple flavor. 

A spearmint version, Hot Tamales Ice, was marketed in the late 2000s, but was subsequently discontinued. It was reintroduced again in 2018 combined with the regular Hot Tamales and marketed as Hot Tamales Fire & Ice.

Ingredients
As listed on the original Hot Tamales and Hot Tamales Fire boxes:

Sugar, corn syrup, modified food starch, contains less than 0.5% of the following ingredients: dextrin, medium chain triglycerides, fruit juice from concentrate (pear, orange, strawberry, cherry, lemon, lime), sodium citrate, pectin, citric acid, malic acid, fumaric acid, confectioners glaze, carnauba wax, white mineral oil, artificial flavors, artificial color, sodium citrate, magnesium hydroxide, red #3, red #40, yellow #5 (tartrazine), yellow #6, blue #1.

See also
 List of confectionery brands

References

External links
1971 Hot Tamales Box Image
Hot Tamales website
Hot Tamales facebook page
Hot Tamales Twitter account

Just Born brands
Brand name confectionery
Products introduced in 1950